Chitralekha Guho is a Bangladeshi television, stage and film actress. She was awarded Bangladesh National Film Award for Best Supporting Actress for her role in the film '71 Er Maa Jononi (2014).

Career
Guho debuted her acting career in 1986 by her role in the play Abbhontorin Kheladhula.

Filmography 
{| class="wikitable sortable"
|-
! Year
! Title
! Role
! Director
! Notes
|-
|1995
|Onno Jibon
|
|Sheikh Niamat Ali
|
|-
|1997
|Shopner Nayok
|Rebecca
|Nasir Khan|
|-
| 2000
| Uttarer Khep|
|Shahjahan Chowdhury
|
|-
| 2001
| Lalsalu|Khalek's Wife
| Tanvir Mokammel
|
|-
| 2004
| Lalon|
| Tanvir Mokammel
|
|-
| 2005
| Molla Barir Bou|Boistami
| Salauddin Lavlu
|
|-
| 2008
| Rabeya|
|Tanvir Mokammel
|
|-
|2011
|Khondo Golpo 1971|
|Badrul Anam Soud
|
|-
| 2012
| Common Gender|
| Noman Robin
|
|-
| 2014
| '71 Er Maa Jononi|Hashem's Mother
| Shah Alam Kiran
|
|-
| 2014
| Jibondhuli|
| Tanvir Mokammel
| 
|-
|2015
|Podmo Patar Jol|Mrs. Shahbaz
|Tonmoy Tansen
|
|-
| 2020
| Rupsha Nodir Banke|
|Tanvir Mokammel
|
|}

 Television 
 Tulite Aka Swapno (2007)
 Mem Saheb (2008)
 Chicken Tikka Masala (2010)
 Noashal 
 Bideshi Bou (2016)
 Syed Barir Bou (2021)
 Ayna (2021)
 Mashrafe Junior'' (2021; Present)

Personal life
Guho is married to Uttam Guho, an art director. Together they have two daughters Arnila Guho and Arnisha Guho.

References

External links
 

Living people
Bengali Hindus
Bangladeshi Hindus
Bangladeshi film actresses
Bangladeshi stage actresses
Bangladeshi television actresses
Best Supporting Actress National Film Award (Bangladesh) winners
Year of birth missing (living people)